Dr Woo Pak Foo, OBE, JP was the medical participator and member of the Urban Council in Hong Kong between 1956 and 1969. He graduated from the University of Edinburgh with bachelor's degree of Medicine and Surgery and a Licentiate in Midwifery. He got the qualification in 1939 and was entitled to practise on 10 May 1940. In 1956, he represented the Civic Association to run for the Urban Council election. He kept re-elected until 1969. He received the Order of the British Empire in 1965 for his public service in Hong Kong.

References

Hong Kong medical doctors
Alumni of the University of Edinburgh
Members of the Urban Council of Hong Kong
Officers of the Order of the British Empire
Hong Kong Civic Association politicians
1976 deaths
Year of birth missing